Elaphrodites is an extinct genus of ants of the subfamily Dolichoderinae. Two fossils were discovered and described by Zhang in 1989.

Species
 Elaphrodites mutatus Zhang, J., 1989
 Elaphrodites scutulatus Zhang, J., 1989

References

†
Insects of China
Fossil taxa described in 1989
Fossil ant genera